Cheb is a town in the Karlovy Vary Region of the Czech Republic. It has about 30,000 inhabitants. It lies on the river Ohře.

Before the 1945 expulsion of the German-speaking population, the town was the centre of the German-speaking region known as Egerland, part of the Northern Austro-Bavarian dialect area. The town centre is well preserved and is protected by law as an urban monument reservation.

Administrative parts
Cheb is divided into the following parts:

 Bříza
 Cetnov
 Cheb
 Chvoječná
 Dolní Dvory
 Dřenice
 Háje
 Horní Dvory
 Hradiště
 Hrozňatov
 Jindřichov
 Klest
 Loužek
 Pelhřimov
 Podhoří
 Podhrad
 Skalka
 Střížov
 Tršnice

Etymology
The name of the town was in 1061 recorded as Egire; in 1179 it was known as Egra; from 1322 as Eger and the surrounding territory as Regio Egere and Provincia Egrensis; after the 14th century also as Cheb or Chba. From 1850 it was given the twin official names of Eger and Cheb.

The name of Cheb is derived from the old-Czech word heb (modern-Czech oheb, ohyb), which means "bend". It is related to bends of the river Ohře.

Geography
The town lies on the river Ohře. The northern and western parts of the municipal territory lie in the Fichtel Mountains; the rest of the territory lies in the Cheb Basin, named after the town.

There are two large reservoirs in the municipal territory: Skalka (northeast of the town and fed by the Ohře) and Jesenice (southeast of the town and fed by the Wondreb). There are also several small ponds, especially in the southern part of the territory.

Climate

History

The earliest settlement in the area was a Slavic gord at what is now known as the Cheb Castle complex, north of the town centre. In 807 the district of today's Cheb was included in the new margraviate of East Franconia, which belonged at first to the Babenbergs, but from 906 to the margraves (marquis) of Vohburg. Děpolt II built the castle about which the town then grew. In 1179 town status was achieved. In 1149, by the marriage of Adelaide of Vohburg to the Emperor Frederick I, Eger (Cheb) came into the possession of the House of Swabia, and remained in the hands of the Holy Roman Emperors until the early 13th century, during which time it became an Imperial Free City.

In 1265, it was taken by the King Ottokar II of Bohemia, who retained it for eleven years. After being repeatedly transferred from one power to the other, according to the preponderance of the Kingdom of Bohemia or the Holy Roman Empire, the town and territory were finally incorporated into Bohemia in 1322, under John of Bohemia. Several imperial privileges, however, continued to be enjoyed by the town until 1849. The later local history was marked by continued resistance against incorporation into Bohemia.

On 5 May 1389, during a Reichstag between King Wenceslaus IV and a group of Imperial Free Cities of south-west Germany, the Peace of Eger was agreed upon, after Wenceslaus had failed to secure his interests in the town.

It suffered severely during the Hussite Wars, during the Swedish invasion in 1631 and 1647, and in the War of the Austrian Succession in 1742. In 1634, during the Thirty Years' War, Albrecht von Wallenstein was killed here. George of Poděbrady gave away his daughter in marriage and fathered two sons in the town. From the Middle Ages until 1945, the lands around the town were known by the German name Egerland.

In 1723, Cheb became a free royal town. The northern quarter of the town was devastated by a large fire in 1809, and many middle-age buildings were irreplaceably destroyed. Until 1851, the renowned spa-town of Františkovy Lázně belonged to the Magistrate of Cheb. The carbonated mineral water coming from these springs was delivered to spa visitors residing in Cheb.

In 1757, the town's financial self-government was abolished for the sake of Austrian centralization. In 1848, the citizen's council demanded separation from Bohemia and reconstitution of its Landtag. Austrian National Socialism and hence German National Socialism can trace its origins to Cheb when Franko Stein transferred a small newspaper (Der Hammer) from Vienna to Cheb in 1897. There he organized a German workers congress called the Deutschvölkischer Arbeitertag, which published the 25-point program.

The terms of the 1919 Treaty of St. Germain triggered civil unrest between the Sudeten German population and the new First Czechoslovak Republic, just as in the rest of the Sudetenland. As elsewhere, protests in the town – now officially named Cheb – were eventually suppressed by force.

During the Sudeten Crisis, the town was occupied by the Nazi German-sponsored Sudetendeutsches Freikorps paramilitary group. On 3 October 1938, the town was visited by Adolf Hitler; shortly afterward Wehrmacht troops marched into the Sudetenland and seized control. From 1938 until 1945, the town was annexed to Germany and it was one of the municipalities in Sudetenland. On 1 May 1939, the town split away from the surrounding district to form its own municipal district together with the settlement of Matzelbach, and gave its name to the most westerly of the three administrative regions of the Sudetenland. The administrative seat of the Regierungspräsident lay in Karlsbad, however.

Cheb was liberated by the 97th Infantry Division of the United States Army on 25 April 1945.

After the end of World War II the region was returned to Czechoslovakia. Under the Beneš decrees of the same year, the German-speaking majority of the town was dispossessed of their homes and property, and was forcibly expelled from the country. In 1954, the town of Amberg, West Germany, adopted the expelled Sudeten German population from Cheb and the surrounding districts.

Demographics
In the 15th century, Cheb was one of the larger towns of Bohemia with inhabitants 7,300 and about 400 houses, plus 200 in suburbs. In 1910, only 0.5% of the population were Czech.
In 1930, 11% were Czech. After World War II, due to the expulsion of ethnic Germans and resettlement of Czechs, the population significantly dropped.

The current population includes a large group of Vietnamese, whose families were invited to the country as guest workers during the Communist era, and Romani, who were resettled after World War II.

Economy
After the Velvet Revolution in 1989, because many goods were cheaper in Cheb than in nearby Germany, it became common for Germans to shop and spend time in Cheb. Because of this the town developed bilingual signage and currency exchange points.

Transport
It is the second-oldest airport in the country and the oldest still existing.

Education
Cheb is known for its Cheb Violin Making School.

Sights

On the rock to the north-west lies Cheb Castle, built in the 12th century and now mostly in ruins.
The main attractions are the Chapel of Saints Erhard and Ursula, the Black Tower and the ruins of a palace; all from around 1180. The chapel has two storeys; the lower storey is in Romanesque style, while the upper storey is Gothic. An eight-cornered opening connects the two storeys. The upper-storey contains a ribbed vault supported on four polygonal columns with statues depicting sins, including a statue of a prostitute and Onan. In the banquet room of this castle, Wallenstein's officers Terzky, Kinsky, Illo and Neumann were assassinated on 25 February 1634. Wallenstein himself was murdered few hours later by Captain Devereux in the burgomaster's house at the main square. The house, a 15th-century gothic town hall (Pachelbel House), was transformed in 1872, it contains many historical relics and antiquities of the town of Cheb.

One of the symbols of the Cheb architecture is a group of houses known as Špalíček. It is located in the middle of the town square and dates from the 13th century. The are mostly in the late Gothic style. The outline of the two blocks can still be seen on the oldest existing records of 1472.

The Green House on the market place belonged to the well-known Wrendl dynasty, whose family crest lies above the entrance. Johann Wolfgang von Goethe frequently spent time here.

The Church of St. Nicholas was established in the 13th century as a three-naved basilica, of which the western portal and the lower part of the tower remain in place. The three-part nave, presbytery and sacristy stem from the Gothic era. After the fire of 1742, the tower was rebuilt with a baroque cupola, after the design of the indigenous architect Balthasar Neumann. The top of the twin steeples were destroyed by German artillery fire during World War II and restored in summer 2008.

The Franciscan Church is located in the town centre. The Church of St. Clara was built according to a design of Christoph Dientzenhofer between 1708 and 1711.

The early-Baroque pilgrimage complex Maria Loreto is located in a local part of Starý Hrozňatov. The annex, which had lain in ruins since 1990 has since been renovated through the initiative of an inhabitant of the neighbouring town Waldsassen.

In popular culture
In Arthur Conan Doyle's Sherlock Holmes story "A Scandal in Bohemia", it is referred to by Holmes as 'Egria'.

Notable people

 Johannes Widmann (c. 1460 – after 1498), German mathematician
 Johann Habermann (1516–1590), German Lutheran theologian
 Albrecht von Wallenstein (1583–1634), military leader and statesman; died here
 Johann Georg Macasius (1617–1653), German physician
 Pavel Klein (1652–1717), Jesuit missionary, botanist, writer
 Johann Balthasar Neumann (1687–1753), German architect and military artillery engineer
 Hugo Zuckermann (1881–1914), Jewish-Austrian poet
 Rudolf Serkin (1903–1991), Czech-American pianist
 Erich Riedl (1933–2018), German politician
 Neda Al-Hilali (born 1938), American fiber artist and weaver
 Peter Glotz (1939–2005), German politician and social scientist
 Norbert Singer (born 1939), German automotive engineer
 Pavel Nedvěd (born 1972), footballer, 2003 Ballon d'Or winner

Twin towns – sister cities

Cheb is twinned with:
  Bắc Ninh, Vietnam
  Hof, Germany
  Nová Dubnica, Slovakia

Since the fall of the Iron Curtain, Cheb has also had cordial relationships with the neighbouring German towns of Waldsassen and Marktredwitz.

Gallery

References

External links

 
 Cheb Castle site
 Church of Maria Loreto 
 Hardeck Castle 
 Euregio Egrensis 

 
Populated places in Cheb District
Cities and towns in the Czech Republic